Thomery is a commune in the Seine-et-Marne department in the Île-de-France region in north-central France, between the forest of Fontainebleau and the river Seine. Thomery station has rail connections to Montereau-Fault-Yonne, Melun and Paris.

Inhabitants of Thomery are called Thomeryons.

Economy
Over the centuries, Thomery has been home to the Chasselas of Thomery table grapes culture (different from the Moissac's chasselas) performed according to ancestral techniques on high walls. After harvesting, the grapes are disposed in especially designed bottles, filled with water and a charcoal piece, and stored over a period of several months in wine caves or cellars built inside the local houses. This technique allows the grapes to be sold after the Christmas season even as late as Easter with perfectly naturally preserved fruits. This tradition has been extremely popular in from 19th century to World War II, and was destinated to rich tables in Paris (grapes were sold at Fauchon) and beyond (the Russian Csar court was also delivered). The peak of production was in the 1920s with more than 800 tons of grapes a year cultured over a total  of walls. The vine walls are still present in Thomery and have been classified in 1993 by the Monuments historiques. Nowadays, only a few inhabitants are still running the activity for local consumption.

See also
Communes of the Seine-et-Marne department
Château de By, a museum in the town

References

External links

Official website 
1999 Land Use, from IAURIF (Institute for Urban Planning and Development of the Paris-Île-de-France région) 

Communes of Seine-et-Marne